Catharine Squires ( Dewes, known as Kate, 1843–1912) was a notable New Zealand church leader. She was born in Leamington, Warwickshire, England in 1843. She preached the Plymouth Brethren faith in Woodend, Pyramid Creek near Gore, and at Bluff in Southland.

References

1843 births
1912 deaths
English emigrants to New Zealand
New Zealand Plymouth Brethren
People from Leamington Spa
New Zealand Protestant ministers and clergy
19th-century New Zealand people